Léon Theerlynck (28 June 1913 – 31 December 1992) was a Belgian became French racing cyclist. He rode in the 1936 Tour de France.

References

External links
 

1913 births
1992 deaths
Belgian male cyclists
Place of birth missing
Sportspeople from West Flanders